The 1998 Iraqi Perseverance Cup was the 3rd edition of the Iraqi Super Cup. The match was contested between Baghdad rivals Al-Shorta and Al-Zawraa at Al-Shaab Stadium in Baghdad. It was played on 25 May 1998 to bring an end to the 1997–98 season. Al-Zawraa won the game 1–0, earning their first Super Cup title.

Match

Details

References

External links
 Iraq Football Association

Football competitions in Iraq
1997–98 in Iraqi football
Iraqi Super Cup